Kurtis Rourke (born October 25, 2000) is a Canadian American football quarterback for the Ohio Bobcats football.

College career
Rourke is the starting quarterback for the Ohio Bobcats football team. After redshirting in 2019, he shared time at quarterback with Armani Rogers in 2020 and 2021.  His sophomore year, he was named MAC student athlete of the week on October 27, 2021. As the primary quarterback for the 2022 Bobcats, he was MAC East offensive player of the week for week one of the 2022 season after passing for 308 yards and four touchdowns against Florida Atlantic. In week 4 he again was MAC East offensive player of the week after passing for a school record 537 yards against Fordham, and again in week 10 with 317 yards and five touchdown passes against Buffalo  After thowing for 3,256 yards and 25 touchdowns, Rourke suffered a season ending torn ACL in the eleventh game of the season against Ball State. In spite of missing the last game and a half of the regular season he won the 2022 Vern Smith Leadership Award for MAC Player of the Year.

Statistics

Personal life
Rourke's older brother Nathan Rourke, who preceded Kurtis as Ohio's starting quarterback, is a professional quarterback for the Jacksonville Jaguars of the National Football League (NFL).

References

External links
 https://ohiobobcats.com/sports/football/roster/kurtis-rourke/2280
 https://www.cfl.ca/2020/12/02/kurtis-rourke-no-stranger-following-brothers-footsteps/
 https://www.thestar.com/sports/football/2020/11/12/kurtis-rourke-very-familiar-with-following-in-the-footsteps-of-older-brother-nathan.html
 https://bvmsports.com/2022/02/10/canadian-qb-kurtis-rourke-follows-cfl-brothers-path-as-ohio-bobcats-signal-caller/

Living people
2000 births
American football quarterbacks
Ohio Bobcats football players
Canadian players of American football
Sportspeople from Oakville, Ontario